Harry Zakour is a Lebanese-Ghanaian based businessman and former association football administrator. He is Second Vice Chairman of National Democratic Congress (2016) and owner of Montie FM's transmitting frequency. CEO of Accra Hearts of Oak, he is seen as one of the most successful club Chief Executive Officers in the history of Ghana football. The Pinnacle of his achievement was in the year 2000 when the club won the Ghana Premier League, The Ghana FA Cup, the Africa CAF Champions League and the Africa super Cup

References

Year of birth missing (living people)
Living people
Ghanaian businesspeople